= UbiCare =

Research platform

- Company type: Private (subsidiary of TPR Media LLC.)
- Industry: Healthcare; Hospitals
- Founded: Boston, Massachusetts, United States (January 25, 2011)
- Founder: Betsy Weaver, Ed.D. Marc Gascon
- Headquarters: 284 Amory St. Boston, Massachusetts, United States
- Area served: Worldwide
- Parent: TPR Media, LLC
- Website: ubicare.com

UbiCare provides a platform for researchers and health care providers to deliver important health information to patients via social media.

The company uses evidence-based content and a platform for care providers to interact with social media users. As of 2011, more than 700 hospitals had already started using Facebook and web services. Most notably, this company enables the public to receive credible health information through social networks. Health topics they cover include: Autism, Cancer, Diabetes, Heart Disease, and Obesity. In May 2017, UbiCare and Truven Health became partners.
